"Facts" (stylized in all caps) is a song by American rap artist Kanye West. It was released as a promotional single on New Year's Eve 2015, marking his first solo release since 2015's "All Day" – West released "Only One" on New Year's Eve the previous year, but that was released as an actual single and not a promotional one. The song was later released on West's seventh studio album The Life of Pablo (2016) as "Facts (Charlie Heat Version)". The song is a diss track aimed at footwear company Nike.

Background
As soon as the song was released, there was speculation of whether or not it would end up on the track listing of West's upcoming album, but in the end, the original version of the song that was released in 2015 didn't end up on his 2016 album The Life of Pablo – an alternative version did instead though, which was titled "Facts (Charlie Heat Version)". When Charlie Heat was asked about his name being on the album credits in an interview with Complex, he said it was: "A dream manifested right in front of my face." On the kickoff show of West's Saint Pablo Tour in Indianapolis on August 25, 2016, he performed "Facts (Charlie Heat Version)" live, but cut the performance of it short.

Composition and lyrics

Facts
Throughout the track, West raps with the flow that Drake used in his 2015 single "Jumpman" with Future and the two artists are actually credited as co-writers.  For both its intro and outro, the song includes a sped-up sample of 1989 track "Dirt and Grime" by Father's Children. As well as this, it contains samples of sound effects from video game Street Fighter II: The World Warrior (1991) throughout, including one of Street Fighter II's announcer yelling 'PERFECT' that's also sampled in "Pt. 2" from the same album as "Facts (Charlie Heat Version)".

"Facts" sees West spin the line: "But the Yeezys jumped over the Jumpman" from his 2012 single "New God Flow" with Pusha T to: "Yeezy, Yeezy, Yeezy just jumped over Jumpman". Kanye brags about the success of his wife Kim Kardashian's Kimoji app with the lines: "Plus Kimoji just shut down the app store, uh!/And we made a million a minute, we made a million a minute".

Charlie Heat Version
"Facts (Charlie Heat Version)" was featured on West's seventh studio album The Life of Pablo rather than the version of "Facts" initially released, with all the samples being kept in the version and the only difference being an alternative backing beat, produced by West, Metro Boomin, Southside and Heat.

Though many of the tracks on The Life of Pablo were updated in June 2016, "Facts (Charlie Heat Version)" wasn't subject to any changes.

Release

Facts
Very shortly before the track was released, Kim made the world aware that her husband was about to come out with new music via Twitter and put '#FACTS' at the end of her tweet, but didn't officially announce it as the title of West's release. Less than ten minutes prior to this, GOOD Music member Cyhi the Prynce had tweeted out the same hashtag, but with no direct reference to Kanye at all and he is a credited writer on "Facts" though. Since it was released as a promotional single, the song was only made available for free streaming on SoundCloud instead of sites like iTunes or Amazon Music where it had to be paid for.

Charlie Heat Version
This version was first heard when it was premiered live along with the rest of an early version of West's 2016 album at Madison Square Garden on February 11, 2016, as part of his Yeezy Season 3 fashion show in collaboration with Adidas and West hushed an anti-Michael Jordan chant during this premiere. The very next morning, it was officially announced as being part of the album.

Following on from The Life of Pablo'''s release, Heat saw an increase in fame due to his production being used.

In popular culture
"Facts" inspired the creation of an article by Jordan Lipsitz of Bustle that fact checked it. It also inspired an article by Matthew Strauss of Inverse looking at the history of bad songs by West.

Reception

Facts
Sidney Freitag of Odyssey described "Facts" as "a way for Kanye to promote his Yeezy shoes" and "not the best song to put on an album", as well as being "mostly a let down", showing a somewhat negative reception towards it. However, The Atlantic gave a much better reception towards the track, with Spencer Kornhaber of the site describing it as West "[reminding] people of why he matters in the first place".

Charlie Heat Version
This version received mixed-to-negative reviews from music critics. "Facts (Charlie Heat Version)" was branded by James Rainis of Slant Magazine as being "just a lot of tough talk from someone who just made the questionably accurate declaration that he’s $53 million in debt" and he also accused West of ripping off Future. Highsnobiety's Jake Indiana voiced the belief that the song possesses "more than a few sonic similarities" to 2 Chainz's Kanye West-featuring 2012 single "Birthday Song", but criticized it for "entirely lacking the fun, sense of humor, and witty lyrics that make [the single] so delightfully bad (in a good way)". The track was placed by Complex on a list of the worst songs on the best albums of 2016, writing: "["Facts"] got a new beat from Charlie Heat, making it listenable for the first time, but "better" and "listenable" don't warrant any song's inclusion on one of the best albums of the year."

Controversy

"Facts" is clearly a diss track aimed at Nike, with lines such as: "If Nike ain’t had Drizzy man they would have nothing" and "Nike, Nike treat employees just like slaves/Gave LeBron a billi' not to run away" being rapped throughout it. Speculation had it upon release of the song that Drake is being dissed within it, but the content isn't actually insulting him by citing references. Bill Cosby and Steve Harvey are both referenced with the lines: "Do anybody feel bad for Bill Cosby?/Did he forget names just like Steve Harvey?" and West caused outrage shortly after the release of "Facts" by declaring Cosby as innocent of sexual assault, despite the lines appearing to be a insult towards him.

Marcus Jordan posted his reaction to the anti-Nike content via Twitter on January 2, 2016, only two days after the track's release. Basketball player LeBron James had an interview regarding this diss, in which he acted in a way that was described as: 'predictably diplomatic, backing Nike and avoiding any direct disagreement with the popular rapper, producer, and designer'. On January 8, two days after James had been interviewed, West himself clarified that there was no beef between the pair of them. West took to Twitter on February 9, 2016 to offer an apology to Michael Jordan and insisted that his beef was with Mark Parker.

Commercial performance
Upon the release of the featuring album, "Facts (Charlie Heat Version)" debuted at number 4 on the US Billboard'' Bubbling Under R&B/Hip-Hop Singles chart and spent a total of three weeks on it.

Credits and personnel

Charlie Heat Version
Credits adapted from West's official website.

Production – Kanye West, Metro Boomin, Southside & Charlie Heat for Very Good Beats, Inc.
Engineering – Noah Goldstein, Andrew Dawson, Anthony Kilhoffer, Mike Dean
Mix – Manny Marroquin at Larrabee Studios, North Hollywood, CA
Mix assisted – Chris Galland, Ike Schultz & Jeff Jackson

Charts

Facts

Charlie Heat Version

Certifications

Charlie Heat Version

References

2015 songs
2016 songs
Diss tracks
Kanye West songs
Nike, Inc.
Obscenity controversies in music
Song recordings produced by Charlie Heat
Song recordings produced by Kanye West
Song recordings produced by Metro Boomin
Song recordings produced by Southside (record producer)
Songs written by Charlie Heat
Songs written by Cyhi the Prynce
Songs written by Drake (musician)
Songs written by Future (rapper)
Songs written by Kanye West
Songs written by Metro Boomin
Songs written by Southside (record producer)
Trap music songs